The 1909 Tulane Olive and Blue football team was an American football team that represented Tulane University as an independent during the 1909 college football season. In their first year under head coach R. R. Brown, the team compiled an overall record of 4–3–2.

Schedule

References

Tulane
Tulane Green Wave football seasons
Tulane Olive and Blue football